Bouchra Ghézielle, née Ben Thami (born 19 May 1979), is a Moroccan-French track and field athlete, now competing for France. She competes mainly on the 1500 m distance but also on 800 m and 3000 m distances.

Born in Khemisset, she competed at the 2004 Olympic Games for Morocco. She won the bronze medals at the 1998 African Championships, the 1998 World Junior Championships and the 2005 World Championships, and finished fourth at the 2005 World Athletics Final.

In 2008, she was found guilty of rh-EPO doping. The sample was delivered on 9 February 2008 in an out-of-competition test in Franconville. She received a suspension from May 2008 to May 2012.

Personal bests
This is a list of her personal best times:

800 metres - 2:00.29 min (2005)
1500 metres - 4:01.28 min (2005)
3000 metres - 8:35.41 min (2005)
5000 metres - 15:12.17 min (2006)

References

1979 births
Living people
French female middle-distance runners
Moroccan female middle-distance runners
Athletes (track and field) at the 2004 Summer Olympics
Olympic athletes of Morocco
Moroccan emigrants to France
Doping cases in athletics
French sportspeople in doping cases
People from Khemisset
World Athletics Championships medalists